João Nuno Alves de Matos  (born 21 February 1987) is a Portuguese professional futsal player who plays as a forward for Sporting CP and the Portugal national team.

Honours

Club

Sporting CP
Campeonato Nacional: 2005–06, 2009–10, 2010–11, 2012–13, 2013–14, 2015–16, 2016–17, 2017–18, 2020–21, 2021–22
Taça de Portugal: 2005–06, 2007–08, 2010–11, 2012–13, 2015–16, 2017–18, 2018–19, 2019–20, 2021–22
Taça da Liga: 2015–16, 2016–17, 2020–21, 2021–22
Supertaça de Portugal: 2008, 2010, 2013, 2014, 2017, 2018, 2019, 2021, 2022
UEFA Futsal Champions League: 2018–19, 2020–21

International
Portugal
UEFA Futsal Championship: 2018, 2022
FIFA Futsal World Cup: 2021
Futsal Finalissima: 2022

Orders
  Commander of the Order of Prince Henry
  Commander of the Order of Merit

References

External links
Sporting CP profile

1987 births
Living people
Futsal forwards
Futsal defenders
Portuguese men's futsal players
Sporting CP futsal players
Sportspeople from Lisbon